Sven Mislintat (born 5 November 1972) is a German football scout and sporting director. He is nicknamed "Diamantenauge" (Diamond Eye) for his ability in spotting players.

He was the chief scout at Borussia Dortmund from 2006 to 2017, signing players such as Robert Lewandowski and Pierre-Emerick Aubameyang, and performed the same role at Arsenal from 2017 to 2019. In 2019, he was hired as sporting director at VfB Stuttgart.

Biography
Born in Kamen, North Rhine-Westphalia, Mislintat is a graduate of Ruhr University Bochum. He qualified as a football coach in 2011. 

In 2006, Mislintat went from being an analyst to being chief scout at Borussia Dortmund in the Bundesliga. The team, which had been saved from bankruptcy a year earlier, changed its recruitment from making big-money transfers to signing and developing young players. His signings included Polish striker Robert Lewandowski in 2010, Pierre-Emerick Aubameyang as his replacement in 2014, Japanese second division winger Shinji Kagawa, young French forward Ousmane Dembélé and FC Bayern Munich II defender Mats Hummels; all performed well at Dortmund and several were sold for significant profits. Dembélé joined from Stade Rennais F.C. for €15 million in 2016 and was sold to FC Barcelona a year later for €105 million.

In November 2017, Mislintat left Borussia Dortmund for Arsenal. He said that he had been looking for an exit from the Westfalenstadion since January 2016, when he was banished from the club's training ground and inner circle by manager Thomas Tuchel, over an argument about signing Óliver Torres from Atlético Madrid. He remained at the Emirates Stadium until February 2019. He signed eight players, of which two were sold for small profits, resulting in a £103 million loss for the club. The largest loss was for Aubameyang, who followed him to Arsenal for £56 million and left for Barcelona for free. In 2021, he defended all his signings in an interview with The Athletic.

In April 2019, Mislintat returned to the Bundesliga as sporting director at VfB Stuttgart.

References

1972 births
Living people
People from Kamen
Ruhr University Bochum alumni
Association football scouts
Borussia Dortmund non-playing staff
Arsenal F.C. non-playing staff
VfB Stuttgart non-playing staff
German expatriates in England